The 1970 Buckeye Tennis Championships was a men's tennis tournament played on outdoor hard courts at the newly created 3,200 seat Buckeye Boys Ranch Stadium in Grove City, Columbus, Ohio in the United States. It was an independent, invitational tournament i.e. not part of the 1970 Grand Prix circuit but it was sanctioned by the United States Lawn Tennis Association (USLTA). It was the inaugural edition of the tournament and was held  from August 14 through August 16, 1970. Bob Lutz won the singles title and earned $4,000 first-prize money.

Finals

Singles
 Bob Lutz defeated  Tom Gorman 7–5, 1–6, 6–4, 6–2
 It was Lutz' second singles title of the year and of his career.

Doubles
 Bob Lutz /  Stan Smith defeated  Tom Gorman /  Ray Ruffels 6–2, 8–6

References

Buckeye Buckeye Tennis Championships
Buckeye Buckeye Tennis Championships
Buckeye Tennis Championships